Manuel Regala (born 4 January 1931, date of death unknown) was a Portuguese rower. He competed in the men's eight event at the 1952 Summer Olympics.

References

External links

1931 births
Year of death missing
Portuguese male rowers
Olympic rowers of Portugal
Rowers at the 1952 Summer Olympics
Place of birth missing